Rasulevo (Räsül) is a rural locality (a village) in Imangulovsky Selsoviet, Uchalinsky District, Bashkortostan, Russia. The population was 292 as of 2010. There are 7 streets.

Geography 
Rasulevo is located 17 km southwest of Uchaly (the district's administrative centre) by road. Kudashevo is the nearest rural locality.

References 

Rural localities in Uchalinsky District